Jorge Eduardo Bianco (born April 28, 1956 in Villa Constitución) is an Argentine former professional footballer who played as a midfielder for clubs in Argentina, Chile, Colombia, El Salvador and Peru.

Teams
 River Plate 1976
 All Boys 1976
 River Plate 1977
 Universidad Católica 1978
 San Marcos de Arica 1979–1980
 Talleres de Córdoba 1981–1982
 Rosario Central 1982
 San Marcos de Arica 1983
 Cúcuta Deportivo 1984
 Central Norte 1985
 Ferro Carril Oeste 1986–1987
 Alianza 1988–1992
 Meteor 1993

References
 

1956 births
Living people
Argentine footballers
Association football midfielders
All Boys footballers
Club Atlético River Plate footballers
Central Norte players
Rosario Central footballers
Talleres de Córdoba footballers
Cúcuta Deportivo footballers
Alianza F.C. footballers
San Marcos de Arica footballers
Club Deportivo Universidad Católica footballers
Argentine Primera División players
Chilean Primera División players
Categoría Primera A players
Argentine expatriate footballers
Argentine expatriate sportspeople in Chile
Expatriate footballers in Chile
Argentine expatriate sportspeople in Colombia
Expatriate footballers in Colombia
Argentine expatriate sportspeople in El Salvador
Expatriate footballers in El Salvador
Argentine expatriate sportspeople in Peru
Expatriate footballers in Peru
Sportspeople from Santa Fe Province